Tami Sagher is an American comedy writer, producer, and actress.

Biography
A native of Chicago, Sagher studied mathematics at the University of Chicago before joining Boom Chicago and then Second City.

Career

TV
Sagher has written for the TV shows 30 Rock, Psych, MADtv and Inside Amy Schumer. She was a staff writer on the CBS sitcom How I Met Your Mother, leaving before the show's final season.

Sagher then spent two seasons as writer-producer on the Netflix series Orange is the New Black. From 2020 to 2021, Sagher was a writer-executive producer on the Hulu series Shrill.

National Public Radio
In addition, Sagher has contributed to This American Life.

Performance
Her performing includes playing an improv performer in Don't Think Twice, starring in the short film The Shabbos Goy, as well as various appearances on TV sitcoms and sketch shows. In particular, she appeared in Season 5 of Curb Your Enthusiasm.

Honors
Sagher has been nominated for 4 Writers Guild of America Awards:
 Three for MADtv; 
 One (2008 in the category of Best Comedy Series) for the third season of 30 Rock.

References

External links

American film actresses
American television actresses
American television producers
American women television producers
American television writers
Living people
American women television writers
Writers Guild of America Award winners
Place of birth missing (living people)
Year of birth missing (living people)
Upright Citizens Brigade Theater performers
21st-century American women